Antimelatoma waimea is an extinct  species of predatory sea snail, a marine gastropod  mollusc in the family Pseudomelatomidae.

Description

Distribution
This extinct marine species is endemic to New Zealand

References

External links
 Beu, A.G. 2011 Marine Molluscs of oxygen isotope stages of the last 2 million years in New Zealand. Part 4. Gastropoda (Ptenoglossa, Neogastropoda, Heterobranchia). Journal of the Royal Society of New Zealand 41, 1–153

waimea
Gastropods of New Zealand
Gastropods described in 2011